Seuca may refer to several places in Romania:

Seuca, a village in Peștișani Commune, Gorj County
Seuca, a village in Găneşti Commune, Mureș County